Föld És Ég is the third album from the Hungarian group After Crying. Released in 1994, it was their last album to feature founding member Csaba Vedres.

Track listing

Personnel
Gábor Egervári - vocals and flute
László Gacs - drums and percussion
Péter Pejtsik - cello, bass and vocals
Ferenc Torma - guitar and vocals
Csaba Vedres - piano, synthesizer and vocals
Balázs Winkler - trumpet, synthesizer and vocals

Notes 

1994 albums
After Crying albums